Henry Sarwer-Foner is a Canadian television director. He has won numerous Gemini, DGC and Canadian Comedy Awards as the director of This Hour Has 22 Minutes, Made in Canada and Corner Gas.

Television
 It's Only Rock & Roll - 1987
 Street Cents - 1989
 This Hour Has 22 Minutes - 1993-2004
 Traders - 1997-1998
 Made in Canada - 1998-2003
 The Associates - 2001
 Corner Gas - 2004
 Rick Mercer Report - 2004 - 2010
 Hatching, Matching and Dispatching - 2005
 Bob & Doug McKenzie's Two-Four Anniversary - 2007
 Less Than Kind - 2008

External links
Ontario District Council - Sarwer-Foner, Henry - Director

Canadian television directors
Living people
Year of birth missing (living people)
Canadian Comedy Award winners